Soap is an American sitcom television series that originally ran on ABC from September 13, 1977, until April 20, 1981. The show was created as a nighttime parody of daytime soap operas, presented as a weekly half-hour prime time comedy. Similar to a soap opera, the show's story was presented in a serial format, and featured melodramatic plotlines including alien abduction, demonic possession, extramarital affairs, murder, kidnapping, unknown diseases, amnesia, cults, organized crime warfare, a communist revolution and teacher-student relationships. In 2007 it was listed as one of Time magazine's "100 Best TV Shows of All-TIME", and in 2010, the Tates and the Campbells ranked at number 17 in TV Guides list of "TV's Top Families".

The show was created, written, and executive produced by Susan Harris, and also executive produced by Paul Junger Witt and Tony Thomas. Each returning season was preceded by a 90-minute retrospective of the previous season. Two of these retrospectives were made available on VHS in 1994, but were not included on any DVD collections.

The show aired 85 episodes over the course of four seasons. Of these, eight episodes (including the final four) aired as one-hour episodes during the original run on ABC. These hour-long episodes were later split in two, yielding 93 half-hour episodes for syndication. Like most sitcoms of the era, Soap was videotaped rather than filmed, but this coincidentally helped further its emulation of the daytime soap opera format, as most such productions were also videotaped. All episodes are available on Region 1 DVD in four box sets. There is a box set of Season 1 on Region 2 DVD. The series has rerun in syndication on local channels as well as on cable.

The show starred Katherine Helmond and Cathryn Damon as sisters and matriarchs of their own families. The cast also included three former soap opera actors. Robert Mandan (Chester Tate) had previously appeared on Search for Tomorrow as a leading man for Mary Stuart, and Donnelly Rhodes (Dutch Leitner) had played the first husband of Katherine Chancellor on The Young and the Restless. Arthur Peterson Jr. ("The Major") played Rev. John Ruthledge in the radio version of Guiding Light.

Plot 

Soap is set in the fictional town of Dunn's River, Connecticut.

In the opening sequence of the first installment, the announcer says "This is the story of two sisters—Jessica Tate and Mary Campbell". The Tates live in a wealthy neighborhood (the announcer calls it the neighborhood known as "Rich"). Jessica Tate (Katherine Helmond) and her husband, Chester (Robert Mandan), are hardly models of fidelity, as their various love affairs result in several family mishaps, including the murder of Peter Campbell (Robert Urich), the stepson of her sister Mary (Cathryn Damon). Even though everyone tells Jessica about Chester's continual affairs, she does not believe them until she sees his philandering with her own eyes. While out to lunch with Mary, Jessica spots Chester necking with his secretary, Claire (Kathryn Reynolds). Heartbroken, Jessica sobs in her sister's arms. On later occasions, it becomes clear that Jess has always known on some level about Chester's affairs but never allowed herself to process the information.

The wealthy Tate family employs a sarcastic butler/cook named Benson (Robert Guillaume). Benson clearly despises Chester, but has a soft spot for their son, Billy (Jimmy Baio). He also gets along with the Tates' daughter, Corinne (Diana Canova) as well as their mother, Jessica; but doesn't speak to the other daughter, Eunice (Jennifer Salt), although that later changed. Benson became a popular character and in 1979 left the Tates' employ to work for Jessica's cousin, Governor Gene Gatling, on the spin-off series, Benson, wherein his last name, DuBois, was revealed. The Tates had to hire a new butler/cook named Saunders (Roscoe Lee Browne), whose attitude is similar to that of Benson, but has a more formal personality.

Mary's family, the Campbells, are working-class, and as the series begins, her son Danny Dallas (Ted Wass), a product of her first marriage to Johnny Dallas, is a junior gangster-in-training. Danny is told to kill his stepfather, Burt Campbell (Richard Mulligan), Mary's current husband, who, Danny is told, murdered his father Johnny, who was also a mobster. It is later revealed that Danny's father was killed by Burt in self-defense. Danny refuses to kill Burt and goes on the run from the Mob in a variety of disguises. This eventually ends when Elaine Lefkowitz (played by Dinah Manoff in one of her earliest roles), the spoiled daughter of the Mob Boss (played by Sorrell Booke), falls in love with Danny and stops her father, who then tells Danny he will have to marry Elaine or he will kill him. In the fourth season, it is revealed that Chester is Danny's true father, the product of a secret affair between him and Mary before his marriage to Jessica. Mary's other son, Jodie (Billy Crystal, in an early role), is gay, having a secret affair with a famous professional football quarterback, and contemplating a sex-change operation.

The first season ends with Jessica convicted of the murder of Peter Campbell. The announcer concludes the season by announcing that Jessica is innocent, and that one of five characters—Burt, Chester, Jodie, Benson, or Corinne—killed Peter Campbell. Chester later confesses to Peter's murder and is sent to prison. He is soon released after a successful temporary insanity defense, due to a medical condition in his brain.

Other plot lines include Jessica's adopted daughter Corinne courting Father Tim Flotsky (Sal Viscuso), who ended up leaving the priesthood, with the two eventually marrying and having a child who is possessed by the Devil; Chester being imprisoned for Peter's murder, escaping with his prison mate Dutch, and being afflicted with amnesia after a failed operation; Jessica's other daughter, Eunice, sleeping with a married congressman, and then falling in love with Dutch; Mary's stepson Chuck (Jay Johnson), a ventriloquist whose hostilities are expressed through his alter ego, a quick-witted dummy named Bob; Jessica's love affairs with several men, including Donahue, a private investigator hired to find the missing presumed-dead Chester, her psychiatrist, and a Latin American revolutionary known as El Puerco ('The Pig'; his friends just call him "El"); Billy Tate's confinement by a cult called the "Sunnies" (a parody of Sun Myung Moon's Unification Church, called the "Moonies" by its critics), and then his affair with his school teacher who becomes unhinged; Danny and his romantic trials with the daughter of a mobster (Elaine, who is murdered in a botched kidnapping), black woman (Polly), a prostitute (Gwen), and Chester's second wife (Annie); and Burt's confinement to a mental institution, his abduction by aliens while being replaced with an oversexed alien lookalike on Earth, and getting blackmailed by the Mob after becoming sheriff of their small town.

At the beginning of each episode, off-camera announcer Rod Roddy gives a brief summary of the convoluted storyline and remarks, "Confused? You won't be, after  week's episode of... Soap." At the end of each episode, he asks a series of life-or-death questions in a deliberately deadpan style—"Will Jessica discover Chester's affair? Will Benson discover Chester's affair? Will Benson care?" and concludes each episode with the trademark line, "These questions—and many others—will be answered in the next episode of... Soap."

Characters

Main 
 Jessica Tate (née Gatling) (Katherine Helmond) – The sister of Mary Campbell and one of the two main characters of the show. She is married to wealthy Chester Tate but separates from and later divorces him in the latter seasons of the series. Sweet-natured, extremely naïve and sheltered, she is often in a world of her own. Her flirtatious nature and hourglass figure make her a frequent target of male attention, but she is honest and loyal to her marriage. She is in denial of her husband's blatant infidelities throughout Season 1, although everyone repeatedly tells her about him and must listen to her increasingly absurd excuses. In Season 1 when she is accused of murder, she has no concept of the seriousness of her trial, flirting and making jokes with the judge. Later seasons show Jessica as still very sweet, but also stronger and less naïve in that she finally throws Chester out of her life. Helmond is one of the two actors to appear in every episode of the series, with Richard Mulligan (Burt) being the other.
 Chester Tate (Robert Mandan) – A wealthy stock broker and Jessica's constantly philandering husband. According to Benson (and nearly everyone else) he will "jump on anything that breathes!" He had affairs with his secretary, Claire (Kathryn Reynolds), and, later, with another woman known as "Pigeon". It was later revealed that he dated Jessica's sister, Mary, before marrying Jessica, and was the biological father of Danny Dallas. Chester and Jessica separate in Season 3 and divorce in Season 4. Although Chester later falls in love with Eunice's friend Annie, and marries her, he still loves Jessica enough to duel for her honor.
 Billy Tate (Jimmy Baio) – The youngest child and only son of Jessica and Chester (according to Benson, "the only one in this family worth a damn"). He gets caught up in a cult, the Sunnies, (from which Benson has to rescue him), and later has an affair with his high school teacher, Leslie Walker. After he breaks off the affair, she makes multiple failed (and laughable) attempts to kill him and/or his family. He later becomes a general in El Puerco's revolutionary army after rescuing him and Jessica from being lost in the ocean, learning Spanish and becoming very devoted to the revolutionaries' anti-Communist cause, though his family members do not take this seriously.
 Corinne Tate Flotsky (Diana Canova) – Jessica and Chester's daughter, who acknowledges she slept with most of the male population of Dunn's River. It is later revealed that she is adopted and is really the daughter of Jessica and Mary's long-lost brother Randolph Gatling (Bernard Fox) and family maid Ingrid Svenson. After a disastrous affair with Peter Campbell, Corinne marries ex-priest Tim Flotsky and gives birth to a baby named Timmy who turns out to be demon-possessed (due to Tim's outraged mother, Flo, cursing the marriage). She later has an affair with Dutch Leitner and then leaves Dunn's River for California to raise Timmy, after Dutch leaves her to get back together with Eunice.
 Father Timothy Flotsky (Sal Viscuso) – A former Catholic priest who leaves the priesthood to marry Corinne Tate, then later leaves her. Father of Timmy, who was possessed by a demon due to Timothy's possessive unhinged mother (Doris Roberts)'s cursing of her son's marriage.
 Eunice Tate-Leitner (Jennifer Salt) – Jessica and Chester's daughter. A spoiled social climber, Eunice dates a married congressman in Season 1 and then falls in love with convicted murderer Dutch Leitner and ultimately marries him. (She also enjoys wearing garter belts.) She is looked down upon by Benson, who only speaks to her to zing or insult her, for much of Season 1, although he does begin to talk to her before he leaves the Tates' employ.
 Dutch Leitner (Donnelly Rhodes) – An escaped dim-witted, good-hearted, emotionally sensitive convict who hides-out with the Tates after helping Chester break out of prison. He falls in love with, and eventually marries Chester's daughter, Eunice, after being involved with Chester's other daughter, Corinne. Though coarse in his manners, Dutch is grateful for the Tates' acceptance and is genuinely devoted to the family, even while struggling to choose between Eunice and Corinne.
 The Major (Arthur Peterson Jr.) – The father of Jessica Tate and Mary Campbell. The Major suffers from dementia and believes he is in the midst of fighting World War II. He often refers to Chester as "Colonel". The Major is always in uniform and often irritates Benson and Saunders with his obliviously racist remarks.
 Mary Campbell (née Gatling, previously Dallas) (Cathryn Damon) – The sister of Jessica Tate and one of the two main characters of the show. Down-to-earth, sensual and much brighter than her sister, she provides a comic foil to her sister's spaced-out antics. At the start of the series she is married to her second husband, building contractor Burt Campbell. Her first husband, Johnny Dallas, was a mobster who, unbeknownst to Mary, was killed by Burt in self-defense. Eventually, she has a baby with "alien" Burt and by the series' end has slowly become an alcoholic, as no one else (besides Chuck and Bob) sees the baby manifesting alien-esque qualities, such as being able to fly.
 Burt Campbell (Richard Mulligan) – Burt is the second husband of Mary Campbell. In contrast to Chester, Burt is a loving family man who has a strong marriage with Mary. Burt is a high-strung building contractor who later becomes sheriff and is under consideration for a run as lieutenant governor. In Season 1, Burt suffers from mental illness due to the murder of his son Peter and his guilt over accidentally killing Mary's first husband. For a time, he believes he can make himself invisible by snapping his fingers. He is also abducted by aliens and replaced with X-23, an alien Burt lookalike (also played by Mulligan). Only Mary and Jodie know that Burt's abduction was real. At the end of Season 3, Burt becomes sheriff and gets increasingly involved in politics, leading him to ignore his family and putting his marriage at risk. Mulligan is one of the two actors to appear in every episode of the series, with Katherine Helmond (Jessica) being the other.
 Chuck and Bob Campbell (Jay Johnson) – Chuck is Burt Campbell's son by his first marriage. A ventriloquist, he is always accompanied by Bob, his dummy and alter ego. The pair dress alike and are always referred to as "Chuck and Bob". While Chuck is mild-mannered, introverted, and polite, Bob is aggressive, rude and abrasive. All of the main characters  except Benson and Saunders find themselves conversing with or referring to Bob directly in the heat of conversation despite their knowledge that he is a ventriloquist's dummy. Bob's obnoxiousness led to threats or actual violence by nearly everyone.
 Danny Dallas (Ted Wass) – Mary Campbell's eldest son. Sweet-natured, good-looking, but not particularly bright, he is a low-level gangster due to his late father's membership, not due to any aptitude or desire of his own. He is given the task of killing his stepfather, Burt, but can't bring himself to do so, and as a result spends most of Season 1 on the run, popping up in ludicrous disguises. It is widely assumed that he is the son of Mary's first husband Johnny Dallas, but in later episodes it is revealed that his real father is Chester Tate: born from his relationship with Mary, before marrying her sister, Jessica, which their mother had arranged. Danny is very protective of his younger half-brother Jodie, but is initially in denial about Jodie's homosexuality. Danny is forced to marry Elaine, the mob boss's daughter, to save his own life. He eventually falls in love with her before she was later kidnapped and fatally shot. Danny later gets involved in a series of failed relationships, including a girlfriend of one of Elaine's kidnappers, Millie, an African-American woman (Polly Dawson), a prostitute (Gwen), and Chester's new wife (Annie). After Chester discovered Danny in bed with Annie, he planned to shoot them both -- this was a series cliffhanger. Danny was also his stepfather (Burt)'s enthusiastic but inept deputy sheriff.
Jodie Dallas (Billy Crystal) – The son of Mary Campbell and her first husband Johnny Dallas. An openly gay man, he shares his mother's common sense and pleasant temperament. He is first dating a closeted football player — played by 1968 Olympic Gold Medalist and 1972 Olympic Silver medalist in Pole Vaulting, Bob Seagren — but later fathers a daughter (Wendy) with Carol, an attorney who seduces him after meeting at his Aunt Jessica's murder trial. After Carol runs off to join the rodeo, Wendy is left with Jodie, triggering a custody battle and a kidnapping. The series ends with Jodie believing himself to be an old Jewish man, Julius Kassendorf, due to a failed hypnotherapy session.
 Peter Campbell (Robert Urich) – Burt Campbell's promiscuous tennis pro son (by Burt's first marriage) is carrying on affairs with both Jessica and Corinne, as well as other women around town, including Sheila Fine (Nita Talbot). His murder in Season 1 led to the first-season cliffhanger: the question of who killed Peter Campbell.
 Benson DuBois (Robert Guillaume) – The Tates' wisecracking African-American cook/butler in the early seasons, who shows utter contempt for Chester. He is frequently the target of the Major's racist quips, but Benson has a soft spot for Jessica, Corinne, and most notably Billy. He completely ignores Eunice while she is secretly dating the Congressman, but this changes after Season 1. In 1979, Benson leaves to be the head of household affairs for Jessica's cousin, Governor Eugene Gatling, in the spin-off, Benson, wherein his last name is revealed as DuBois. Benson makes a brief re-appearance when Jessica is diagnosed with a fatal disease.
 Saunders (Roscoe Lee Browne) – Benson's African-American replacement as the Tates' cook/butler, with a disdainful attitude similar to Benson's, although with a more cultured and polished personality.

Announcer 

 Rod Roddy (Casey Kasem in the pilot)

Recurring 

 Barney Gerber (Harold Gould) – Elderly hospital patient who shares a room with Jodie in Season 1, and whose story gives Jodie the inspiration to continue living after a suicide attempt.
 Detective Donahue (John Byner) – Hired by Jessica to find the missing amnesiac Chester in Season 2, he falls for Jessica, forcing her to choose between the two when Chester returns home.
 Dennis Phillips (Bob Seagren) – A quarterback who is dating Jodie secretly in Season 1 and more openly in early Season 2 after the failure of his sham marriage.
 Ingrid Svenson (Inga Swenson) – Corinne's biological mother, who was the former maid of Jessica and Mary's parents, and who was in love with Jessica and Mary's brother, Randolph Gatling. She attempts to carry out revenge upon the Tate/Campbell family for opposing her romance with Randolph. She tries to influence Jessica's murder trial by sleeping with the judge and blackmailing Sally, Burt's secretary, into trying to break up Burt and Mary's marriage.
 E. Ronald Mallu, Esq. (Eugene Roche) – High priced attorney who defends Jessica in her murder trial. Mallu returns in Season 3 to represent Jodie in his custody case, and attempts to date the newly separated Jessica as well. Mallu is a thinly veiled caricature of the defense attorney F. Lee Bailey.
 The Godfather (Richard Libertini) – Mob over-boss who orders Danny to kill Burt (the killer of Danny's father) in Season 1. When Danny fails to do so, The Godfather eventually forgives him as Danny is clearly an incompetent gangster.
 Chief of Police Tinkler (Gordon Jump) – Responsible for the investigation of the murder of Peter Campbell, Tinkler always seems to arrive at the Tate house in time to share their dinner. Apparently also serves as the court bailiff in Dunn's River. (Routinely misidentifies himself as "Piece of Cholief" Tinkler)
 Congressman Walter McCallum (Edward Winter) – Secretly sees Eunice until his wife, Marilyn, blackmails him into ending the relationship.
 Judge Anthony Petrillo (Charles Lane) – The judge presiding over Jessica's murder trial. Lost $40,000 in a bad investment deal because of Chester, and clearly holds a grudge against him for it.
 Claire (Kathryn Reynolds) – Chester's secretary and mistress in Season 1. She had been with Chester as his secretary for twelve years, and had been his mistress for almost as long. During the first season, she blackmails Chester, ordering him to divorce his wife or go to prison for Securities Fraud. During one of her lunchtime dates with Chester, Jessica saw them kissing and cuddling and she finally realizes that Chester was not to be trusted. Upon seeing the two, Jessica breaks down in her sister, Mary's arms. Chester later dumps and then fires Claire to support Jessica during the trial, which sends Claire into a screaming rage in the restaurant, trashing their meal in the process. She made good on her threat to call the Securities and Exchange Commission and blows the whistle on Chester.
 Sally (Caroline McWilliams) – Burt's secretary who attempts to seduce Burt, then lies to Mary about sleeping with him, all of which was due to blackmail pressure from the family's enemy, Ingrid Svenson. (Due to their performances on Soap, Caroline McWilliams and Inga Swenson were given roles on the spin-off, Benson, playing Governor's secretary Marcy Hill and Cook Gretchen Kraus, respectively)
 Polly Dawson (Lynne Moody) – A young African-American widow who lives with Danny and considers marriage to him in Season 3.
 Leslie Walker (Marla Pennington) – A young school teacher who falls for Billy, but becomes suicidal and then homicidal after he breaks it off. One of her attempts to kill Billy ends up injuring Saunders.
 Millie (Candice Azzara) – Girlfriend of one of Elaine's kidnappers, she rescues Danny, and comes home with him, but cannot deal with the Campbell family and thus leaves.
 Gwen (Jesse Welles) – A prostitute who falls for Danny in Season 4, but leaves him to protect them both from a death threat.
 Elaine Lefkowitz (Dinah Manoff) – Daughter of Danny's mob under-boss, her obnoxious, pushy personality makes a coerced marriage painful for Danny at first. After they genuinely fall in love, and her personality softens, Elaine is kidnapped and fatally shot, which fuels Danny's quest for revenge.
 Charles Lefkowitz (Sorrell Booke) – Elaine's mob-boss father and Danny's under-boss, who calls off the contract on Danny in exchange for marrying Elaine, then cuts her off and refuses to pay the ransom when she is kidnapped.
 Dr. Alan Posner (Allan Miller) – Jessica's somewhat disturbed psychiatrist in Season 3, he briefly dates her once she is separated from Chester, but becomes clingy and hysterical when she dumps him.
 El Puerco (Gregory Sierra) – An anti-communist revolutionary who initially kidnaps Jessica, but later falls in love with her. (El Puerco translates to 'The Pig'.)
 Mr. Franklin (Howard Hesseman) – The smarmy prosecuting attorney in Jessica's murder trial, and a strong rival of Mallu. Has a twin brother (Hesseman), who is also an attorney, whom Chester attempted to hire to represent Jessica, but refused to take the case.
 Mrs. Lurleen David (Peggy Pope) – Carol's mother, who takes care of Jodie and Carol's baby, Wendy, when Carol runs away to join the rodeo. She leaves the baby with Jodie, but then becomes part of the custody battle, initially lying for her daughter on the witness stand, but eventually telling the truth.
 F. Peter Haversham (Michael Durrell) – Ruthless attorney who represents Carol in the custody battle. Arch-nemesis of E. Ronald Mallu.
 Alice (Randee Heller) – A lesbian who lives with Jodie in Season 2, but who leaves after finding out Mrs. David's reluctance to leave Jodie's child with a lesbian as well as a gay man. (Alice is American television's first recurring lesbian character).

In 1978, when WCCB gave up its ABC affiliation to former NBC affiliate WSOC-TV and became independent, the latter station aired the show starting with late-night summer repeats of the first season, then showed it in its regular prime time slot the following fall. Except for two individuals, the only angry calls came from people wondering what happened to Saturday Night Live, which could now be found on WRET.

"The Soap Memo" 
Aside from the external protests, Soap was also subject to heavy internal revisions from ABC's Broadcast Standards & Practices department, which monitors the content of programs. Writer-creator Susan Harris had developed a story arc for Soap in the form of a "show bible" which traced all the major characters, stories and events for five seasons. The Standards & Practices executives (commonly referred to as "censors") reviewed this extensive bible as well as the script for the two-part pilot and issued a long memo to Harris voicing their concerns about various story lines and characters. In addition to the sexual material that was widely reported in the press, the censors also took issue with the show's religious, political and ethnic content.

"The Soap Memo" was leaked to the press before the show premiered and was printed in its entirety in the Los Angeles Times on June 27, 1977. Among the notes were:

 "Please delete [the lines] '...the slut', 'that Polish slut', 'get your clothes off', 'it doesn't grow back', 'transsexual', 'Oh my God', 'did it hurt?'"
 "Substitute [the words] fruit, slut, tinker bell."
 "The CIA or any other government organization is not to be involved in General Nu's smuggling operation." (This character and storyline, which dealt with a Vietnamese opium smuggler who becomes involved in the Tate family through Jessica's long-lost son, was eventually removed from the show bible.)
 "In order to treat Jodie as a gay character, his portrayal must at all times be handled without 'limp-wristed' actions"
 "The colloquy between Peter and Jessica ... which relates to cunnilingus/fellatio is obviously unacceptable"
 "The relationship between Jodie and the football player should be handled in such a manner that explicit or intimate aspects of homosexuality are avoided entirely."
 "Father Flotsky's stand on liberalizing the Mass will have to be treated in a balanced, inoffensive manner. By way of example, the substitution of Oreos for the traditional wafer is unacceptable."

"The Soap Memo" also contained notes that were subsequently disregarded by the producers including:
 "Please change Burt Campbell's last name to avoid association with the Campbell Soup Co."
 "Corinne's affair with a Jesuit priest, her subsequent pregnancy as a result, and later exorcism, are all unacceptable."
 "Please direct Claire to dump the hot coffee in some part of Chester's anatomy other than his crotch." (Susan Harris later responded to this note: "so we didn't—we poured it in his .")

"The Soap Memo" was a rare public look into the behind-the-scenes process at a major network and copies of the document were often found posted on the bulletin boards of television production companies and on studio sets as a rallying point against censorship. In addition, the specific details in the memo further fueled the growing debate regarding the controversial content of Soap.

Premiere and critical reception 
Soap premiered on Tuesday, September 13, 1977, at 9:30p.m.  The episode was preceded by a disclaimer that the show "was part of a continuing character comedy" that included adult themes and that "viewer discretion" was advised. The disclaimer was both displayed on the screen and read by announcer Rod Roddy. It would remain throughout the first season before being dropped.

Much of Soap's controversy, among liberals and conservatives alike, ironically actually helped to sell the series to the general public. Fueled by six months of pre-show protests (as well as a solid lead-in from the hit shows Happy Days, Laverne & Shirley and Three's Company), the first episode swept its time slot with a 25.6 rating and 39% share (39% of the national audience). Although ABC received hundreds of phone calls after the premiere, executives at the network described initial public reaction as "mild" with more calls in favor of the show than in protest. A University of Richmond poll found that 74% of viewers found Soap inoffensive, 26% found it offensive, and half of those who were offended said they planned to watch it the next week.

Initial reviews—somewhat clouded by the controversy—were mixed, with negative reviews predictably focusing on the show's racy content. The Los Angeles Times called the show "a prolonged dirty joke" that "is without cleverness or style or subtlety. Its sex jokes are delivered by the shovelful, like manure." Variety called the show "forced and derivative", "bland" and "predictable and silly" while conceding that the sex is "no more outrageous than daytime soapers, no more outspoken than Three's Company."

Time magazine praised the "talented cast" and singled out Jimmy Baio and Billy Crystal as "sharp young comedians", but felt the show suffered from "nastiness" and "lacked compassion".

On the more positive side, TV Guide gave the show a good review saying that there was "a heap of talent" in the cast and asking "Is it funny? Yes it is... and I guess that constitutes redeeming social value".

Harry F. Waters' 1977 Newsweek review proved prescient of conservative reaction when the following year, the National PTA declared Soap one of "ten worst" shows in television. In spite of this designation, Soap ranked #13 for the 1977–78 season and went on to gain positive critical reviews and high ratings over the rest of its four-year run.

Later seasons and cancellation 

Although the uproar against Soap subsided shortly after its premiere, the program continued to generate additional criticism for its relatively frank depictions of homosexuals, racial and ethnic minorities, the mentally ill as well as its treatment of other taboo topics such as social class, marital infidelity, impotence, incest, sexual harassment, rape, student-teacher sexual relationships, kidnapping, organized crime, murder of and by cast members, and new age cults. Much of the criticism focused on the openly gay character of Jodie Dallas (Billy Crystal). Soap was among the earliest American prime time series to include an openly gay character who was a major part of the series. Some social conservatives opposed the character on religious grounds, while some gay rights activists were also upset with the character of Jodie, arguing that certain story developments reinforced distorted stereotypes, for example his desire to have a sex change operation, or represented a desire to change or downplay his sexual orientation.

Before the start of the second season, ABC ran a 90-minute retrospective clip show called "Who Killed Peter?" in which Burt Campbell visits Jessica Tate in prison as she awaits the verdict of her murder trial. The two discuss each of the show's individual characters and their possible motives for killing Burt's son Peter using flashbacks to illustrate specific story lines. The show was designed to remind viewers of what happened in Season 1 to prepare them for the upcoming season.

At the start of season three, another 90-minute retrospective aired in which Jessica says goodbye to Benson, using the flashback clips to try to explain why he should stay. This show also served to help launch the spinoff Benson, which was premiering at the start of the 1979–80 television season.

A third 90-minute retrospective titled "Jessica's Wonderful Life" aired at the start of Season 4. Jessica, who had just died in the  hospital, found herself in heaven speaking to an angel (played by Bea Arthur). Jessica explained via the flashback clips why she was not ready to die and had to return to earth to help her family.

Although Susan Harris had planned for five seasons of Soap, the program was abruptly canceled by ABC after its fourth season. Therefore, the final one-hour episode, which originally aired on April 20, 1981, did not serve as a series finale and instead ended with several unresolved cliffhangers. These involve a suicidal Chester preparing to kill Annie (his wife) & Danny (his nephew) after catching them in bed together, an irreversibly hypnotized Jodie believing himself to be a 90-year-old Jewish man, Burt preparing to walk into an ambush orchestrated by his political enemies, and Jessica about to be executed by a Communist firing squad. Vlasic Foods pulled its sponsorship of the program shortly after this episode aired and ABC announced that the program was not renewed for its planned fifth season. The official reason given by the network was its declining ratings. However, according to the Museum of Broadcast Communications, Soap "ended under suspicion that resistance from ad agencies may have caused ABC to cancel [it] at that point" because its still controversial content was negatively affecting its relationship with sponsors.

A 1983 episode of Benson mentions Jessica's disappearance, noting the Tate family is seeking to have her declared legally dead. In the episode, Jessica appears as an apparition who only Benson can see or hear and reveals to him that she is not dead, but in a coma somewhere in South America. No other incidents from the final episode of Soap are mentioned, and the opening bars of the theme song for Soap play as she leaves the room.

Legacy 
Since its cancellation, Soap's reputation has grown and it is often considered one of the best shows in television history. Much praise has been given to its "exceptionally rich cast" of performers "such as was seldom seen on any serious dramatic show".

In a 1982 analysis in The Village Voice, published as the series was entering syndication, TV critic Tom Carson lauded the ensemble, saying that "the cast matches the best TV series rep troupes ever." Carson went on to note that Soap "patently started out intended as a lampoon of middle-class values, and ended up instead as a weirdly offbeat celebration of them".

In 2007, Time, which initially panned the show, named it one of the "100 Best Shows of All-TIME". The Museum of Broadcast Communications said that Soap is "arguably one of the most creative efforts by network television before or after".

In 2010, The Huffington Post called Soap a "timeless comedy" and concluded: "Rarely does a show come along with such a unique voice and vision from the first episode".

Awards and nominations 
Soap was nominated for a total 17 Emmy Awards including:
 Outstanding Comedy Series – nominated: 1978, 1980, 1981
 Outstanding Lead Actor in a Comedy Series (Richard Mulligan) – won: 1980, nominated: 1981
 Outstanding Lead Actress in a Comedy Series (Cathryn Damon) – won: 1980, nominated: 1978, 1981
 Outstanding Lead Actress in a Comedy Series (Katherine Helmond) – nominated: 1978, 1979, 1980, 1981
 Outstanding Supporting Actor in a Comedy Series (Robert Guillaume) – won: 1979
 Outstanding Directing in a Comedy Series (Jay Sandrich) – nominated: 1978, 1979
 Outstanding Art Direction in a Comedy Series – won: 1978
 Outstanding Achievement in Video Tape Editing in a Comedy Series – nominated: 1978

At the 1981 Golden Globe Awards, Katherine Helmond won Best Performance by an Actress in a TV Series – Musical/Comedy. That same year, the program was also nominated for Best TV Series – Musical/Comedy.

Director Jay Sandrich was nominated for Outstanding Directorial Achievement in Comedy Series at the DGA Awards in 1978 and 1979.

Home media 
Sony Pictures Home Entertainment has released all four seasons of Soap on DVD in Region 1. Season 1 has been released on DVD in Region 2 in Norway (as Forviklingar), Sweden (as Lödder), Spain (as Enredo) and the UK. All four seasons have been released in Australia (Region 4).

Some of the episodes on these DVD collections are edited or replaced with the syndicated versions, shortened by as much as 2 to 3 minutes. Season 1 is also missing the disclaimer at the start of the show. In addition, the DVDs omit the three 90-minute Soap retrospective clips shows, which aired before each season began to remind the audience of what happened in the story during the previous season. The season 1 retrospective "Who Killed Peter Campbell?" and season 3 retrospective "Jessica's Wonderful Life" were released on VHS in the 1990s.

On August 27, 2013, it was announced that Mill Creek Entertainment had acquired the rights to various television series from the Sony Pictures library, including Soap. The company subsequently rereleased the first and second seasons on DVD on September 2, 2014, and Soap: The Complete Series on DVD in Region 1 on June 2, 2015. Most of the episodes on the Mill Creek sets are the original, uncut ABC versions, and the "On the last episode of Soap..." synopses from the final season have been restored.

See also 

 List of Soap episodes
 Mary Hartman, Mary Hartman (1976)
 Benson (1979)
 The Life and Times of Eddie Roberts (1980)

References

External links 

 Encyclopedia of Television 
 
 Extended audio interview with Jay Johnson about Soap

1970s American satirical television series
1970s American sitcoms
1970s American LGBT-related television series
1970s American sex comedy television series
1977 American television series debuts
1980s American satirical television series
1980s American sitcoms
1980s American LGBT-related comedy television series
1980s American sex comedy television series
1981 American television series endings
Adultery in television
Television series about alien visitations
American Broadcasting Company original programming
American LGBT-related sitcoms
American parody television series
American television soap operas
English-language television shows
Television controversies in the United States
Television series about families
Television series by Sony Pictures Television
Television shows set in Connecticut
Television soap opera parodies